Vimala is a 1960 Indian Telugu-language film produced and directed by S. M. Sriramulu Naidu. The film stars Savitri and N. T. Rama Rao, with music composed by S. M. Subbaiah Naidu.

Plot 
The story is set during the British Raj. Prince Vijaya Kumar (N. T. Rama Rao) was once on a tour with his friends and he was caught by dacoit Ugra Simha (Rajanala). Vimala (Savitri), a young and energetic girl protects and takes him to her house. Both of them fall in love, but Vimala's father Anantayya (Gummadi) objects to their marriage. Vijaya Kumar leaves the house when Vimala asks her father why he had done so, he starts revealing his past. Anantayya's actual name was Rajeswara Prasad, he was the brother of Anathagiri's ruler. When Vimala was 3 years old, he was arrested on the allegation of killing his brother. He escaped from the jail and ran away along with his daughter Vimala and her mother Rajyalakshmi (Sandhya) who is still living in the motherland. After that, due to some conflict with Ugra Simha, both father and daughter get separated while traveling in a boat. Both of them separately reach Ananthagiri, which was under the rule of Appalaraya Bahadur (K. V. S. Sarma), an eccentric person and a puppet in the hands of a servant Venkatappaiah (Ramana Reddy) and a Butler (Relangi). Vimala meets her mother Rajyalakshmi, without giving her identity, she joins as a servant in her mother's house. She was surprised to see Vijay as her maternal uncle and Vijay is also happy to know that Vimala is his elder sister's daughter. Both of them decide to prove Rajeswara Prasad's innocence. Vijay in disguise joins in the kitchen as a cook by the name of Gopalam, Rajeswara Prasad and Vimala are also trying to solve the murder mystery, Finally, the real culprits Appalaraya Bahadur, Venkatappaiah, and the Butler are caught, and they are found guilty for their criminal offense. At last, the entire family is reunited and the movie ends with the marriage of Vijay & Vimala.

Cast 

Savitri as Vimala / Lalitha Kumari
N. T. Rama Rao as Vijay Kumar / Gopalam
Gummadi as Rajeswara Prasad / Anathaiah
Rajanala as Ugra Simha
Relangi as Butler
Ramana Reddy as Venkatappaiah
K. V. S. Sarma as Appalaraya Bahadoor
Malladi as Chidananda Swamy
Vengalli as Viswam
M. S. Rao as C.I.D. Inspector
Seshagiri as Berri Shetty
Suryakantham as Manikyamba
Rushyendramani as Anjana Devi
Sandhya as Rajyalakshmi Devi
Saraswathi as Chandrika
Balakumari as Chamanti
Sujatha as Gowri

Soundtrack 
Music composed by S. M. Subbaiah Naidu. Lyrics were written by Muddu Krishna.

Reception 
The Indian Express wrote, "The director has made capital use of Savithri in the first half of the picture to keep the spell of glamour aglow and the last stages are prolonged by a series of comic diversions".

References

External links 
 

1960 films
1960s Telugu-language films
Films directed by S. M. Sriramulu Naidu
Films scored by S. M. Subbaiah Naidu
Indian black-and-white films